The Stadium Lokomotīve formerly the Latvijas Spīdveja Centrs is a 10,000 capacity motorcycle speedway stadium in the central part of Daugavpils, Latvia.

History
The stadium is a regular venue for the World Championship round known as the Speedway Grand Prix of Latvia.

The speedway track opened on 17 November 1963 and is 373 metres in size. The stadium hosts the leading Latvian motorcycle speedway team known as Lokomotiv Daugavpils, who race in the Polish leagues.

The track record of 66.01 sec was set by Grigory Laguta on 30 May 2010.

Track record timeline (373m)

See also 
Speedway Grand Prix of Latvia

References

Sport in Daugavpils
Speedway venues in Latvia